Santiago Vilaseca (born 17 September 1984 in Montevideo), is a Uruguayan rugby union player. He currently plays a Lock for the Old Boys Club U21 in the Campeonato Uruguayo de Rugby.

Vilaseca, represents the Uruguay national team and has captained the side on many occasions, most notably during the 2015 Rugby World Cup. Having earned 32 caps for his country, on 30 August 2015 he was selected to captain Uruguay into their first World Cup campaign in 12 years, the last being during the 2003 Rugby World Cup.

References

External links
 

1984 births
Living people
Uruguayan rugby union players
Uruguay international rugby union players
Rugby union locks
Rugby union players from Montevideo
People educated at The British Schools of Montevideo